Radosław Sebastian Kaim (born 7 October 1973) is a Polish actor.

Filmography 
2000: Egoiści
2002: Jak to się robi z dziewczynami
2003: Show
2007: It's a Free World...
2010: Patagonia
2011: Waterloo Road
2011: Wild Bill
2013: Spies of Warsaw (TV Series)
2015: Capital
2019: Silent Witness (TV series)
2022: A Spy Among Friends (TV series)

External links 
 
Radosław Kaim at filmpolski.pl

Polish male actors
1973 births
Living people